For All We Know is Ruud Jolie’s solo project. Jolie is best known for being the guitarist for Within Temptation. Written over a four-year period this album contains 12 original songs and features several guest musicians.

Track listing

 Blind Me (4:08)
 Busy Being Somebody Else (5:30)
 Out of Reach (6:02)
 When Angels Refuse to Fly (5:42)
 I Lost Myself Today (4:31)
 Keep Breathing (1:56)
 Down On My Knees (9:02)
 Save Us... (3:48)
 Embrace/Erase/Replace/Embrace (2:52)
 Tired and Ashamed (5:27)
 Open Your Eyes (5:20)
 Nothing More... (4:08)

All music and lyrics written by Ruud Jolie except “Blind Me”, music written by Wudstik.
Arrangements by Ruud Jolie. Vocal harmony arrangements by Ruud Jolie and Wudstik.
Produced by Ruud Jolie

Personnel
Wudstik – vocals
Ruud Jolie – guitar
Kristoffer Gildenlöw – bass
Léo Margarit – drums
Thijs Schrijnemakers – Hammond
Marco Kuypers – Rhodes and piano

Guest musicians
Daniel Gildenlöw – vocals
Sharon den Adel – vocals
Ruud Houweling – vocals
Damian Wilson – vocals
Anke Derks – vocals
Tom Sikkers – vocals
John Wesley – guitar
Richie Faulkner – guitar

References

External links
 Official Website

2011 albums
Ruud Jolie albums